Chaudhry Anwar Ali Cheema (1 January 1935  – 31 July 2016) was a Pakistani politician.

Political career 
He was born on January 1, 1935, in Sargodha, Punjab, British India and did his graduation from Government College, Lahore, now called Government College University, Lahore. He was recruited as naib tehsildar in 1961 but he quit in 1974 and subsequently started his political career by contesting elections of the District Council member where he remained vice chairman and chairman till 1987. Anwar Ali Cheema held the office of District Council Chairman for Sargodha. He won election to the Pakistan National Assembly on seven consecutive occasions between 1985 and 2013 which is a unique honor. He represented the Pakistan Muslim League (Q) party.

Cheema held the office of Federal minister of health for few days and was then made Federal Minister of Production. He was given the title of Shenshah-e-Tameerat (King of Development) for his works in his constituency and Sargodha city.

Cheema had been an MNA from NA-67 (Now NA-91) for seven consecutive terms from 1985 to 2013. He was known to be a companion of Prime Minister Nawaz Sharif but parted ways and joined the PML-Q when Chaudhry Shujaat Hussain and Chaudhry Pervaiz Elahi formed the party with the blessings of former president retired General Pervez Musharraf. His son's father-in-law is Chaudhry Tajammal Abbas, a first cousin of Chaudhry Shujaat Hussain, due to which he shifted loyalties from PML-N.

Cheema has a son and a daughter. His son, Chaudhry Aamir Sultan Cheema, is a former provincial minister of irrigation and livestock. He has been elected member of provincial assembly six times. Cheema's daughter in law, Tanzeela Aamir Cheema has been elected MNA twice and also held the office of chairman district council Sargodha. She belongs to the Chaudhry family of Gujrat. Sardar Arif Nakai, Ex- Chief Minister Of Punjab, who was Anwar Ali Cheema's brother in law.

Death
Anwar Ali Cheema died on 31 July 2016, in Lahore, Pakistan after a protracted illness.

References

External links 
 http://www.na.gov.pk/en/profile.php?uid=114
 http://www.pap.gov.pk/index.php/members/profile/en/9/125

1935 births
2016 deaths
People from Sargodha District
Pakistan Muslim League (Q) MNAs
Pakistani MNAs 1985–1988
Pakistani MNAs 1988–1990
Pakistani MNAs 1990–1993
Pakistani MNAs 1993–1996
Pakistani MNAs 1997–1999
Pakistani MNAs 2002–2007
Pakistani MNAs 2008–2013
Pakistan Muslim League (N) MNAs
Government ministers of Pakistan